Jean Berger (September 27, 1909 – May 28, 2002) was a German-born American pianist, composer, and music educator. He composed extensively for choral ensemble and solo voice.

Early years
Berger was born Arthur Schloßberg into a Jewish family in Hamm, Westphalia. He studied musicology at the universities of Vienna and Heidelberg, where he received his Ph.D. in 1931 with Heinrich Besseler as his advisor. He also studied composition with Louis Aubert in Paris. While working as the assistant conductor at an opera house in Mannheim, he was forcibly removed from a rehearsal by Brown Shirts. After the Nazi Party seized power in Germany in 1933, he moved to Paris, where he took the French name Jean Berger and toured widely as a pianist and accompanist. From 1939 to 1941, he was an assistant conductor at the Municipal Theater in Rio de Janeiro and on the faculty of the Brazilian Conservatory. He also toured widely throughout South America. In 1941, he moved to the United States and served in the U.S. Army starting in 1942. In 1943, he became a US citizen. He worked in the Office of War Information producing foreign-language broadcasts and USO shows until 1946. From 1946 to 1948, he worked as an arranger for CBS and NBC and toured as a concert accompanist.

Academic career
In 1948 Berger moved into the academic world, taking a faculty position at Middlebury College in Middlebury, Vermont, which he held until 1959. From 1959 to 1961, he was on the faculty of the University of Illinois at Urbana–Champaign. From 1961 to 1966, he taught at the University of Colorado at Boulder and then the Colorado Women's College in Denver from 1968 to 1971. From 1970 on, he lectured widely throughout the world on various aspects of American music.

Major works
Three of Berger's pieces have become standards in the choral repertoire: "A Rose Touched by the Sun's Warm Rays", "Alleluia" from Brazilian Psalm, and "The Eyes of All Wait Upon Thee".

Other works include:
 Short Overture for Strings
 Five Canzonets
 Three Ayres
 Magnificat
 Hope for Tomorrow, set to words spoken by Martin Luther King Jr., during the third month (February 1956) of the Montgomery bus boycott.

Personal life
Berger was a National Patron of Delta Omicron, an international professional music fraternity. He died in Aurora, Colorado, of a brain tumor at the age of 92.

References

External links
Interview with Jean Berger, June 25, 1988

1909 births
2002 deaths
People from Hamm
American male classical composers
American classical composers
American classical pianists
American male pianists
German classical composers
German male classical composers
German classical pianists
University of Colorado Boulder faculty
German emigrants to the United States
Heidelberg University alumni
University of Vienna alumni
Middlebury College faculty
University of Illinois Urbana-Champaign faculty
Jewish American classical composers
American people of German-Jewish descent
20th-century classical pianists
20th-century German musicians
20th-century American pianists
20th-century American composers
20th-century American male musicians
20th-century American Jews
21st-century American Jews